Clear Lake Audiotorium is a six-track promo EP by De La Soul given out to A-list DJs in 1994, the catalog number is TB 1093 (Side A, "THIS SIDE" is TB 1093 A and Side B "OTHER SIDE" is TB 1093 B). It was composed of four tracks from the group's album Buhloone Mindstate and two non-album tracks—"Sh.Fe.Mc's" featuring A Tribe Called Quest, and "Stix & Stonz" featuring The Fearless Four, Grandmaster Caz, and Prince Whipper Whip. With only 500 copies pressed (vinyl and CD), Clear Lake Audiotorium remains one of the most sought-after De La Soul releases to date. Originally pressed on clear/light green vinyl and packaged in a clear plastic sleeve, the record has since been bootlegged on black vinyl.

Track listing
"In the Woods"  – 4:01
Featuring: Shortie No Mass
"I Am I Be"  – 5:03
"Sh.Fe.Mc's"  – 4:34
Featuring: A Tribe Called Quest
"Patti Dooke"  – 5:39
Featuring: Guru 
"I Be Blowin'"  – 4:58
"Stix & Stonz"  – 7:26
Featuring: Tito of The Fearless Four, Grandmaster Caz, Whipper Whip, LA Sunshine, and Superstar

De La Soul albums
1994 EPs
Tommy Boy Records EPs